Jen Soska and Sylvia Soska (born April 29, 1983), also known as The Soska Sisters or The Twisted Twins, are Canadian twin sisters who collaborate as film directors, producers and screenwriters. They are known for directing often violent and visceral horror movies such as Dead Hooker in a Trunk, See No Evil 2 and American Mary.

Biography
Jen and Sylvia Soska were born on April 29 in Canada. The twins graduated from Argyle Secondary School. Their love of horror began at an early age, when their mother gave in to their constant begging to watch Poltergeist. They decided to work in the horror movie field soon after, initially trying to become actresses and working as extras, but were unhappy with the stereotypical twin roles they were being offered.

Dead Hooker in a Trunk 
Jen and Sylvia briefly attended film school and wrote and directed Dead Hooker in a Trunk as a final project. The film was shot for $2,500 and released by IFC. It received an overall rating of 80% from critics at Rotten Tomatoes (4 fresh and 1 rotten review). The twins starred in the film as twin sisters – Badass (Sylvia) and Geek (Jen). Highly inspired by Robert Rodriguez's Rebel Without A Crew, the Soskas sought out El Mariachi star Carlos Gallardo to play the character God.

An absurdist dark satire, Dead Hooker in a Trunk originated as a faux trailer the sisters created, annoyed when their film school cut the budget for their final project. The film had a screening cancelled by one movie theater in Saskatoon after the theater received anonymous complaints.

American Mary 
Following their first project, the twins wrote American Mary which was shown at Film4 Fright Fest, Toronto After Dark Film Festival and Monster Fest. The twins cast Canadian horror star Katharine Isabelle (Ginger Snaps) as Mary Mason, and had special effects created by Masters FX. Wanting to be respectful to the body modification community, the sisters hired flesh artist Russ Foxx as a consultant to ensure authenticity. American Mary went on to win the Special Jury Award at Fantastic Fest.

Following the success of the film, the twins took to social media with the announcement of an "American Mary" TV Series, stating: "I know a lot of you are excited and curious about an American Mary series, after Rabid we connected with Cronenberg's producers at Prospero who have been champions in developing the series. We are currently making a sci-fi thriller called Unseen together with Radar & Film Mode. In the meantime, we have been enjoying connecting with fans of the film and hearing what they want to see in the television series version. It's always been a passion to explore these characters and their lives more deeply. To understand their struggles and see their wins."

ABCs of Death 2 
The sisters directed a segment in ABCs of Death 2 titled "T is for Torture Porn", which follows an actress, Yumi, as she auditions for an adult film scene. Yumi is revealed to be a hentai monster. The film was produced by XYZ Films.

See No Evil 2 
Jen and Sylvia Soska made two films for WWE Studios: See No Evil 2 and Vendetta. See No Evil 2 again featured Katharine Isabelle. Avid fans of professional wrestling, the Soskas were hired to resurrect the franchise after a six-year hiatus.

Vendetta 
The first film in the Lionsgate and WWE Studios Action Six Pack was the Soska Sisters' action film  Vendetta, written by Justin Shady. The film stars Dean Cain as Mason Danvers, who goes into prison in pursuit of the man who killed his wife.

Rabid 
The Soskas co-wrote and directed Rabid (2019), a remake of David Cronenberg's 1977 film of the same name, starring Laura Vandervoort and professional wrestler CM Punk. Avid fans of David Cronenberg's work, the Soskas hired cast and crew from Cronenberg's previous films. They again collaborated with Masters FX, hiring Steve Kostanski as head creature designer.

Rabid had its World Premiere on the closing night of the 20th Annual Fright Fest in London. It would go on to play film festivals throughout Europe and was released on Blu-ray on October 7, 2019. It had its  North American Premiere on October 15, 2019, in LA at Screamfest. Shout! Factory released the film theatrically and on VOD December 13, 2019.

On the Edge 
In September 2022, the Soskas announced the premiere of their new film On the Edge, to take place at the London FrightFest Halloween festival on October 29. The film was shot and produced in Canada and co-stars Aramis Sartorio, Jen Soska, Sylvia Soska and Mackenzie Gray. The festival synopsis of the film reads, "Family man Peter gets more than he paid for when he books a 36-hour session with the sadistic Mistress Satana who seems more intent on making him suffer for his sins. Is it blackmail? Is it torture? Or is it the Devil come for his soul? Will Peter’s faith save him from his own personal Hell or is he already damned? A brilliant depiction of how Kink Culture can heal past trauma and be a source for shocking redemption."

Other work
Jen and Sylvia have written for Marvel Comics, writing a Night Nurse story for Marvel's Secret Wars Journal #5 in 2015, a short story called The Ripley with the Guardians of the Galaxy, and a Deadpool story for the first annual Avengers Halloween Special. In January 2019, the Soska Sisters started writing Black Widow for Marvel with illustrator, Flaviano in a series called 'No Restraints Play.' The story would have the infamous Russian spy taking on an international child sex trafficking ring to bloody consequences.

The twins hosted both seasons of the Blumhouse-produced Hellevator on GSN. They were interviewed for Eli Roth's History of Horror which aired October 2018.

The Hollywood Reporter announced July 14, 2020, that the Soska Sisters had been hired by Radar Pictures, founded by Ted Field, to adapt a game about a couple that wakes up blind into a feature film. There hasn't been too much revealed about the film, but through interviews, it appears to be a project that the sisters have been working on quietly behind the scenes.

In April 2021, it was announced that the Soskas would be working for DC Comics with their first story being a part of their DC Round Robin in which fans choose their favorites in an online voting competition.

Filmography

Film

Television

References

External links

Canadian game show hosts
Canadian women film directors
Film producers from British Columbia
Canadian women screenwriters
Horror film directors
1983 births
Living people
Sibling filmmakers
Canadian twins
People from North Vancouver
Canadian women film producers
Sibling duos
Film directors from British Columbia
21st-century Canadian women writers
21st-century Canadian screenwriters